The Anyangcheon Stream Walkway (안양천 산책로) is a walkway located along the Anyangcheon river to Guro, Seoul. It connects several cities and districts in Gyeonggi and Seoul. It is one of the Nine Scenic Views of Guro (구로구경:九老九景) and its cherry blossom trees make it a very popular biking and hiking trail. The Anyangcheon Stream is an educational location where visitors can see various types of plants, fish, and migratory birds.

Geography 
The walkway follows the Anyangcheon Stream which begins west of Baekunsan Mountain in Uiwang-si, crosses through Gunpo-si, Anyang-si, Gwangmyeong-si in Gyeonggi and the Gemcheon-gu, Guro-gu, Yangcheon-Gu, Yeongdeungpo-gu in Seoul. Finally, the stream meets the Han River near the Seongsan Bridge.

References

External links
Guro Culture, Sports and Tourist Portal 

Environment of South Korea
Guro District, Seoul
Parks in Seoul